This is a sub-article to Uthman
ʿUthmān ibn ʿAffān (Arabic: عثمان بن عفان) (c. 576 – June 17, 656) was the third Caliph of the Ummah, and is regarded by the Muslims as one of the Four Righteously Guided Caliphs. He reigned from 644 until 656. He was the companion of Islamic prophet Muhammad.

Family tree

Children and Descendants

See also 
Succession to Muhammad
The four Rashidun
Muhammad – Family tree of Muhammad
Abu Bakr – Family tree
Umar – Family tree
Ali – Family tree

References

Uthman
Uthman